Nuevo Rocafuerte is a town in Ecuador. The capital of Aguarico Canton in Orellana Province, it was founded in 1942 as a result of a battle which displaced the inhabitants of the original settlement and subsequent border agreements which made this location a key border spot on the border with Peru.

It is the birthplace of 46th Ecuadorian president Lenín Moreno.

Climate
Nuevo Rocafuerte has a tropical rainforest climate (Af) with heavy rainfall year-round.

Sources

Columbia Lippincott Gazetteer (New York: Columbia University Press, 1952) p. 1354.

Populated places established in 1942
Populated places in Orellana Province
1942 establishments in Ecuador